Costa Rica women's national under-17 football team represents Costa Rica in international youth football competitions.

Competitive record

FIFA U-17 Women's World Cup

The team has qualified in 2008 and 2014

CONCACAF Women's U-17 Championship

Previous squads
2008 FIFA U-17 Women's World Cup
2014 FIFA U-17 Women's World Cup

See also
Costa Rica women's national football team

References

External links
Official website
FIFA profile

U17
Women's national under-17 association football teams
Central American women's national under-17 association football teams